This is a list of seasons of Stockholm-based Swedish ice hockey club Djurgårdens IF.

Notes

References

Djurgårdens IF Hockey seasons